Honsla Rakh is a 2021 Indian Punjabi-language romantic comedy film directed by Amarjit Singh Saron starring Diljit Dosanjh, Sonam Bajwa, Shehnaaz Gill, it marks the debut of Diljit Dosanjh as producer. The film is set in Vancouver, Canada, and depicts the story of a divorced father, who raised his son on his own. It was  released worldwide theatrically on 15 October 2021.

Synopsis
The story of the film revolves around a divorced father, who raised his son single-handedly. He starts to face problems when he starts dating. The situation gives arise to romance and comedy.

Plot
Yenkey Singh is a divorced single parent, who lives with his son, Honsla Singh. He runs a successful Indian restaurant in Canada. He is desperate to find a woman for marriage, and always introduces his son as his younger brother whenever he meets a pretty girl. One day, at the airport, while waiting for a delayed flight, he accidentally meets Sweety, his ex-wife, while waiting for their delayed flight. 

In a flashback, a young Yenkey and Sweety are on a date where Sweety places a condition that after marriage, they won't have any kids and would focus on their careers. But, after a few months of their marriage, Sweety accidentally gets pregnant and often experiences mood swings. She demands a divorce and wants Yenkey to get the child's custody. After the child is born, Sweety leaves Yenkey and her newborn child with him, whom he names Honsla. Then, the film depicts the struggle Yenkey faced as a single parent, and how he couldn't marry a single girl as he is always rejected for having a child. 

After the flashback, Sweety is revealed to be a successful fashion designer, who then finally meets her son, Honsla. Just as she meets Honsla, her new husband calls her, thus disappointing Yenkey. As the delayed flight is cancelled, Yenkey meets Jasmine, and falls in love with her instantly. They become friends and start dating. Yenkey proposes to Jasmine, but as soon as she finds out he has a son, she rejects him. But Honsla immediately lies, stating that his first wifeis dead, causing Jasmine to marry Yenkey.

Initially, both of them introduce Honsla as Yenkey's younger brother to their family, and Jasmine's parents agree to their marriage. The situation deteriorates when Sweety and her husband appear at his wedding. Yenkey and Honsla both decide to tell everyone the truth, as he doesn't want to hurt Jasmine and her parents anymore.

During their engagement, Yenkey tells everyone the truth. He confesses that Sweety was his first wife and Honsla is his and Sweety's son. Seeing his father sad, Honsla decides to stay with Sweety for his father's sake, but Yenkey, who loves Honsla, leaves the engagement on the spot. Then, it is revealed that both were doing a small drama to convince Jasmine and her family members.

All of them finally forgive Yenkey and accept Honsla. Just as Sweety and her husband leave, Honsla calls Sweety "Mummy", thus enlightening her. Yenkey says that Sweety can meet Honsla whenever she wants and the film ends on a happy note with a group photo.

Cast
 Diljit Dosanjh as Yenkey Singh, Restaurant owner, Jasmine's husband, Sweety's ex-husband, Honsla's father
 Sonam Bajwa as Jasmine, yoga teacher, Yenkey's wife, Honsla's stepmother
 Shehnaaz Gill as Sweety, a fashion designer, ex-wife of Yenkey Singh, Honsla's mother
 Shinda Grewal as Honsla Singh, Yankey and Sweety's son, Jasmine's stepson
 Anayah Miglani

Production
The film was announced by Diljit Dosanjh on 18 February 2021 with the lead cast Diljit Dosanjh, Sonam Bajwa, Shehnaaz Gill and Shinda Grewal, the son of actor Gippy Grewal. The film marks Dosanjh's debut as a film producer.

Filming began in March 2021 in Vancouver, Canada and principal photography was wrapped on 1 April 2021 in Canada. A promotional song of the film which was scheduled to be shot on 15 September in London was postponed, as Shehnaaz Gill was mourning the death of her friend, actor Sidharth Shukla. It was reported that Shehnaaz Gill will shoot the promotional song on 7 October.

Release
Honsla Rakh certified with running time of 145 minutes, was released worldwide on 15 October 2021 coinciding with Dussehra holidays in India.

Home video
Honsla Rakh was released for streaming on Nov 24 on Amazon Prime Video.

Soundtrack

The soundtrack of the film is composed by Intense and lyrics written by Raj Ranjodh. The first track "Chanel No 5" is released on Tips Punjabi on 30 September. Second track "Guitar" composed by JSL and sung by Raj Ranjodh is released on 4 October. 3rd track "Sher" composed by
Yeah Proof is released on 8 October. Four days later, 4th track "Lalkaara" composed by Avvy Sra was released on 12 October. On 14 October 5th track "Saroor" composed by Avvy Sra was released. Title track was released on 20 October.

Track list

Reception
Jaspreet Nijher reviewing for The Times of India rated the film with 4 stars out of 5, praised storyline writing, "[... the film] is a sublime exhibit of emotions through various equations, that of a father and his son, between a man and a woman and eventually between a woman and her son." Nijher praised the performances of Diljit Dosanjh and Shinda Grewal. Nijher wrote, "Shinda is winning hearts with his effortless acting, without losing the innocence of a child of seven." Nijher said while concluding the review: "The comedy is just enough to keep the focus on romance and the emotions, and entertaining with its straightforward references." Kritika Vaid of India.com rated the film with 3 stars out of 5 and wrote, "Honsla Rakh gives you two hours and 25 minutes of laughter. An easy-breezy family entertainer with nothing much to write about!" Kiddaan.com gave the film 4 stars out of 5 and praised the performance of Diljit Dosanjh, Sonam Bajwa, Shehnaaz Gill and Shinda Grewal, stating that "they all have done commendable jobs". Criticising the music, they wrote, "we also believe that if its music was a little better, it could have uplifted the overall feel of the movie." Kiddaan stated that "Honsla Rakh is the kind of entertainer we all needed for a long time, hence without any second thoughts, it is a must-watch."

Box office 

The film , has grossed  worldwide.

PTC Punjabi Film Awards 2022 

Honsla Rakh received five awards at the PTC Punjabi Film Awards 2022:

 Best Film
 Best Director - Amarjit Singh Saron
 Best Actor - Diljit Dosanjh
 Most Popular Song of The Year - Guitar by Raj Ranjodh
 Best Cinematography - Baljit Singh Deo

References

External links
 

Punjabi-language Indian films
2020s Punjabi-language films
2021 films
Indian romantic comedy-drama films
Films shot in Vancouver
2021 romantic comedy films
2021 comedy-drama films